The 2004 Stanley Cup Finals was the championship series of the National Hockey League's (NHL) 2003–04 season, and the culmination of the 2004 Stanley Cup playoffs. The Eastern Conference champion Tampa Bay Lightning defeated the Western Conference champion Calgary Flames in seven games, becoming the southernmost team to win the Stanley Cup. It was Tampa Bay's first-ever appearance in the final. Lightning owner William Davidson would soon become the first owner in sports history to win two championships in one year as eight days later, the other team that Davidson owned (the Detroit Pistons of the NBA) won the NBA title in five games over the Los Angeles Lakers. This was the last Stanley Cup Final played for two years, as the 2004–05 NHL lockout began three months after the end of this final, lasting over ten months and leading to the cancellation of the 2005 Final, with the league not returning to play for the Cup until 2006. This was the last of three consecutive Finals to feature a team making its debut appearance.

Paths to the Finals

Tampa Bay Lightning
Tampa Bay finished the season with 106 points and entered the playoffs as the Eastern Conference’s top seed, qualifying for the first time in seven seasons. They defeated the eighth, seventh, and third-seeded teams, beating the New York Islanders 4–1, the Montreal Canadiens 4–0 and the Philadelphia Flyers 4–3, in order, and they advanced to the Finals for the first time in franchise history since their establishment in 1992. It was also the third and final year in a row in which a team made their debut Finals appearance, after the Carolina Hurricanes and Anaheim Ducks.

Calgary Flames
Calgary finished the season with 94 points, qualifying for the playoffs for the first time since 1996. As the sixth seed, they defeated the Western Conference's top three seeded teams, which were the Vancouver Canucks 4–3, the Detroit Red Wings 4–2 and the San Jose Sharks 4–2, in order, and made it to the Finals for the first time since 1989.  This also marked the first time a Canadian team made it to the Finals since the Vancouver Canucks lost to the New York Rangers in the 1994 Stanley Cup Finals.

Game summaries

Game one

The first game, at St. Pete Times Forum, saw the Flames win 4–1. Dave Andreychuk began the game with a record 634 career goals without a Stanley Cup Finals appearance. Calgary only got 19 shots off against the Lightning defense, but more than one-fifth found the net. Martin Gelinas got Calgary on the board early, and they extended the lead to 3–0 in the second period on goals by Jarome Iginla, his 11th of the playoffs, and Stephane Yelle. Chris Simon added the fourth and final Calgary goal after Tampa Bay's Martin St. Louis scored the lone Lightning goal.

Game two

Game two saw the same final score, but this time, it was Tampa Bay winning a clutch game to tie the series, 1–1, headed to Calgary. Ruslan Fedotenko's 10th goal of the postseason got the Lightning on the board first, and Tampa Bay used three third-period goals, coming from Brad Richards, Dan Boyle, and St. Louis, respectively, to blast the game open. The lone Calgary goal was scored by Ville Nieminen.

These Finals would be the last until 2013 to be tied after two games. The team with home ice in games one and two held a 2–0 edge in every Final between 2006 and 2011. In 2012, the Los Angeles Kings won the first two games at New Jersey.

Game three

The series shifted to the Pengrowth Saddledome in Calgary, where Flames goalie Miikka Kiprusoff and the Calgary defense completely stonewalled the Tampa Bay attack, which only took 21 shots in a 3–0 Flames victory. Simon scored the first Calgary goal in the second period, and Shean Donovan and Iginla added goals to ice the game.

Game four

With a chance to take a commanding 3–1 series lead, Calgary was shut out by Lightning goalie Nikolai Khabibulin, who recorded his fifth shutout of the postseason, a 29-save shutout, in a 1–0 Tampa Bay victory, with the game's lone goal being scored by Brad Richards three minutes into the game on a two-man advantage.

With 4:13 left in the game, Ville Nieminen checked Vincent Lecavalier into the boards from behind, drawing a five-minute major penalty for boarding, a game misconduct penalty, and an eventual game five suspension. Meanwhile, fans at the Pengrowth Saddledome angrily booed referees Kerry Fraser and Brad Watson throughout most of the contest. They were originally also scheduled to work game six in Calgary but the league eventually decided to replace them.

Game five

The series returned to Tampa Bay tied, 2–2, for a critical game five, and Calgary pulled off a 3–2 overtime victory to move within one win from the Stanley Cup. After Gelinas and St. Louis traded goals in the first period, Iginla scored for Calgary late in the second period. However, Fredrik Modin tied the game for the Lightning 37 seconds into the third period. The 2–2 score held until after 14:40 had gone by in overtime, when Oleg Saprykin's first goal since the first round won the game for the Flames.

Game six

Back to Calgary for game six, each team scored two second-period goals, with Richards scoring two for the Lightning and Chris Clark and Marcus Nilson for the Flames. In the third period, there was a dispute over a Martin Gelinas redirect that appeared to have gone in off of his skate. A review from one camera angle appeared to show the puck crossing the goal line before Khabibulin's pad dragged it out, though some (including Lightning Tim Taylor) argue that the puck had not only been knocked several inches above the goal line (thus making there appear to be white ice between the puck and the goal line) in front of Khabibulin's pad, but that it was also "kicked" by Gelinas. The play was never reviewed. However, the ABC broadcast of Game 7 showed a CGI video analysis of the play, which estimated that the puck did not completely cross the line, and that the call on the ice was correct. The CGI company who did the analysis of the video was based out of Calgary. The game entered overtime with the Flames needing only a goal to win the Stanley Cup. However, thirty-three seconds into the second overtime, St. Louis put in the game-winner for the Lightning to force a winner-take-all seventh game in Tampa.

Game seven

In a tense game seven, Fedotenko scored goals for Tampa Bay late in the first period and late in the second period for a 2–0 lead. After Conroy scored to narrow the deficit to 2–1, Calgary bombarded Khabibulin after taking only seven shots in the first two periods. After the Conroy goal, Khabibulin stopped 16 Calgary shots. The series ended as Flames center Marcus Nilson missed a last-second opportunity to force overtime. Tampa Bay won the game, 2–1, and the Stanley Cup. Tampa wouldn't win another championship until 2020.

Team rosters
Years indicated in boldface under the "Finals appearance" column signify that the player won the Stanley Cup in the given year.

Calgary Flames

Tampa Bay Lightning

Stanley Cup engraving
The 2004 Stanley Cup was presented to Lightning captain Dave Andreychuk by NHL Commissioner Gary Bettman following the Lightning's 2–1 win over the Flames in game seven

The following Lightning players and staff had their names engraved on the Stanley Cup

2003–04 Tampa Bay Lightning

Stanley Cup engraving
Darren Rumble played only five regular-season games, and did not play in the playoffs. Rumble was a healthy reserve for the rest of the season.
Eric Perrin played in four regular-season games and twelve playoff games (four in the conference in finals).
Stanislav Neckar played two games in the conference finals. Neckar was on the Nashville Predators injury reserve list majority of the season, before joining Tampa Bay in a trade on March 9, 2004.
Ruslan Fedotenko was the first player who was born and raised in Ukraine, and exclusively trained in the country to win the Stanley Cup.
Tampa Bay was given permission to include these players on the Stanley Cup even though they did not qualify. Rumble for spending the whole season with Tampa Bay, and Perrin and Neckar for playing in the conference finals.

All 52 members were included with their full first and last names on the presentation Stanley Cup, filling the last spot on it. When the engraver Louise St. Jacques went to engrave the replica Stanley Cup, there was less space available. There was more space between each winning team on the replica Stanley Cup than on the presentation Stanley Cup. Louise decided to keep each member's name in the same order on the same line on the replica Stanley Cup, so all names were engraved with their first initial and full last name. This is another way of telling the presentation Stanley Cup from the replica Stanley Cup. (see 1984 Stanley Cup Finals and 1993 Stanley Cup Finals)

Broadcasting
In the United States, this was the last Stanley Cup Finals to air on ABC and the ESPN family of networks until the 2022 Finals. ESPN televised the first two games while ABC broadcast the rest of the series. Due to the 2004–05 NHL lockout, which suspended play for the next season, this marked the end of ESPN's third run and ABC's second run as the main NHL broadcasters. NBC and OLN would pick up the rights to broadcast the NHL for the  season. The Comcast-owned OLN would later be renamed Versus for the  season, then re-branded as NBCSN on January 2, 2012, following Comcast's 2011 acquisition of NBC, effectively moving to the NHL on NBC banner.

In Canada, the CBC's broadcast of game seven of the Finals drew 4.862 million viewers, making it the highest-rated NHL game on the CBC since game seven of the 1994 Final, which drew 4.957 million viewers. However, those numbers include both pre-game and post-game coverage. The game itself drew 5.560 million viewers, up from 5.404 in 1994.

References

Notes

 
Stanley Cup
Stanley Cup Finals
Stanley Cup Finals
Stanley Cup Finals
21st century in Tampa, Florida
Calgary Flames games
Ice hockey competitions in Tampa, Florida
Stan
Stanley Cup Finals
2000s in Calgary
Ice hockey competitions in Calgary
May 2004 sports events in the United States
June 2004 sports events in the United States